Door to Door is a 2002 American television drama film about Bill Porter, an inspiring and successful door-to-door salesman with cerebral palsy. The film stars William H. Macy, who plays Porter, and also features Helen Mirren, Kyra Sedgwick, Michael Shanks, and Kathy Baker.  Door to Door, directed by Steven Schachter, was produced for the TNT cable network. It was nominated for twelve and won six Emmy Awards, including Outstanding Made for Television Movie and Outstanding Lead Actor in a Miniseries or Movie (William H. Macy). It also won a Peabody Award. It premiered on TNT on July 14, 2002.

Porter had been told for many years that he was not employable, but he was determined to succeed and focused his efforts into working as a salesman for Watkins.  Despite the awkwardness and pain of his condition, he would walk eight to ten miles a day to meet his customers. Porter supported himself, and continued to work as a salesman until age 69.

Door to Door is also the name of a 2009 Japanese TV movie, starring Kazunari Ninomiya, which is set in Japan and loosely based on the Bill Porter story.

References

External links 
 
 TNT: Door to Door

2002 biographical drama films
2002 films
2002 television films
American biographical drama films
Films about people with cerebral palsy
Films directed by Steven Schachter
Films scored by Jeff Beal
Peabody Award-winning broadcasts
Primetime Emmy Award for Outstanding Made for Television Movie winners
TNT Network original films
American drama television films
2000s American films
Films about disability
Films about salespeople